The Kentucky Linux Athlon Testbed (KLAT2) is a 64+2 node Beowulf cluster built by the University of Kentucky College of Engineering in 2000.  The cluster used entirely off the shelf components.

See also
 Open Source Cluster Application Resources
 TORQUE Resource Manager
 Maui Cluster Scheduler

External links
 The Aggregate: KLAT2

University of Kentucky